Bilići may refer to:

 Bilići, Serbia, a village near Sombor
 Bilići, Travnik, a village near Travnik

See also
 Bilić (disambiguation)